NGC 801 is a spiral galaxy with an active galaxy core in the constellation Andromeda. It is estimated to be 174 million light-years from the Milky Way and has a diameter of approximately 174,400 light-years. The object was discovered on September 20, 1885 by the American astronomer Lewis A. Swift.

References 

801
Spiral galaxies
Andromeda (constellation)
007847